The World Singles Ninepin Bowling Classic Championships is a biennial nine-pin bowling competition organized by the World Ninepin Bowling Association (WNBA NBC). The World Championships was started in 2006, after dividing the championships into Team and Singles.

During the first championships in Skopje, the pairs event took place for the last time in history. Since 2008, the Single's Championships have in the program sprints and mixed tandems events, after removing them from the Team Championships (successively in 2005 and 2007).

List of championships

Medal count

List of hosts 
List of hosts by number of championships hosted.

References

 
World championships in ninepin bowling classic
Recurring sporting events established in 2006